Cecilia Bartoli OMRI (born 4 June 1966) is an Italian coloratura mezzo-soprano opera singer and recitalist. She is best known for her interpretations of the music of Bellini, Handel, Mozart, Rossini and Vivaldi, as well as for her performances of lesser-known music from the Baroque and Classical period. She is known for singing both soprano and mezzo roles.

Bartoli is considered a coloratura mezzo-soprano with an unusual timbre. According to Nicholas Wroe in 2001, her voice was known for its "fully developed sumptuousness of the lower register, the vibrancy of the middle range...the top was limpid and powerful", and she was one of the most popular opera singers of recent years.

Early life 
Bartoli was born in Rome. Her parents, Silvana Bazzoni and Pietro Angelo Bartoli, were professional singers and gave her her first music lessons. She first performed publicly at age nine as the shepherd boy in Tosca. Bartoli later studied at the Conservatorio di Santa Cecilia in Rome. At the age of 19, she made her singing debut on the Italian television show Fantastico. She did not win the competition but was asked to sing with Paris Opera for a homage concert for Maria Callas.

Career
Bartoli made her professional opera debut in 1987 at the Arena di Verona. The following year she undertook the role of Rosina in Rossini's The Barber of Seville at the Cologne Opera, the Schwetzingen Festival and the Zurich Opera earning rave reviews. Working with conductors Daniel Barenboim and Nikolaus Harnoncourt, Bartoli focused on Mozart roles, such as Zerlina in Don Giovanni and Dorabella in Così fan tutte, and from then on her career developed internationally.

In 1990, she made her debut at the Opéra Bastille as Cherubino in Mozart's The Marriage of Figaro and her debut at the Hamburg State Opera as Idamantes in Mozart's Idomeneo, followed by her La Scala debut as Isolier in Le comte Ory in 1991, a performance that solidified her reputation as one of the world's leading Rossini singers.

In 1996, Bartoli made her debut at the Metropolitan Opera as Despina in Così fan tutte and returned in 1997 to sing the title role of La Cenerentola and in 1998 to sing the role of Susanna in The Marriage of Figaro. In 2000, she sang in another Mozart soprano role, Donna Elvira in Don Giovanni, at the Deutsche Oper Berlin. In 2001, she made a long-awaited Royal Opera House debut, taking the roles of Euridice and the Genio in the London stage premiere of Haydn's L'anima del filosofo.

Work in Baroque music 

In addition to Mozart and Rossini, Bartoli has spent much of her career performing and recording Baroque and early Classical era music by such composers as Gluck, Vivaldi, Haydn and Salieri. In early 2005, she sang Cleopatra in Handel's Giulio Cesare. She often performs with the Baroque ensemble Il Giardino Armonico.

In 2012, Bartoli produced a project entitled Mission, which premiered the works of Agostino Steffani, a lesser-known Baroque composer. Bartoli produced the music of the composer in CD form as well as an extended music video that portrays her as the priest-composer Agostino in the palace of Versallies. The video is known for its historic and visual accuracy of the Baroque period. Cecilia Bartoli's performance and production of Mission reflect the music and aesthetic of Steffani's time period through the setting, wardrobe, and cinematography."

Work in bel canto 
In 2007/08, Bartoli devoted her time to studying and recording the early 19th-century repertoire – the era of Italian Romanticism and bel canto – and especially the legendary singer Maria Malibran, the 200th anniversary of whose birth was celebrated in March 2008. The album Maria was released in September 2007. In May 2008, Bartoli sang the title role written for Malibran in a revival of Fromental Halévy's 1828 opera Clari at the Zurich Opera. In June 2010, she sang the title role of Bellini's Norma for the first time with conductor Thomas Hengelbrock in a concert at the Konzerthaus Dortmund. In March 2011, Bartoli toured five Australian cities with two programs drawn from Sacrificium and Maria.

Salzburg 

In 2012, Bartoli became the artistic director of the Salzburg Whitsun Festival, an extension of the traditional Salzburg Festival, which produces performances during Whitsun (Pentecost) weekend. Forgoing the academic programming of her predecessors, she reformulated the festival's programming—returning to "the old recipe of organizing beautiful programs and inviting great artists"—resulting in record ticket sales and placing the festival on the international opera calendar. In 2012, she sang Cleopatra in Handel's Giulio Cesare, in 2013 the title role in Vincenzo Bellini's Norma, and in 2014 Rossini's La Cenerentola.

Personal life 
Bartoli lives with her husband, Swiss baritone Oliver Widmer, in Zollikon on the Goldcoast shore of Lake Zurich, Switzerland, and in Rome, part of the year. The couple married in 2011 after twelve years together. Bartoli lived in Monaco in the early 2010s.

Awards and honours 
Bartoli was appointed Chevalier of the French Ordre des Arts et des Lettres (1995), and Commander of Monaco's Order of Cultural Merit (November 1999)

In 2003, she received the Brit Award for Outstanding Contribution to Music at the Classic Brit Awards.

In 2010, she was awarded the Honorary Degree of Doctor of Music from University College Dublin.

In 2011, she won a fifth Grammy Award for Best Classical Vocal Performance for Sacrificium. In 2012, she was voted into the magazine's Gramophone's Hall of Fame. She is the 2012 recipient of the Herbert von Karajan Music Prize.

Discography

Opera

Rossini: La scala di seta (Fonit Cetra, 1988)
Rossini: Il barbiere di Siviglia (Decca, 1989)
Mozart: Così fan tutte (Erato, 1990)
Mozart: Lucio Silla (Teldec 1991)
Rossini: La Cenerentola (Decca, 1993)
Puccini: Manon Lescaut (Decca, 1993)
Mozart: Le nozze di Figaro (DG, 1994)
Mozart: La clemenza di Tito (Decca, 1995)
Haydn: L'anima del filosofo, ossia Orfeo ed Euridice (Decca, 1997)
Rossini: Il turco in Italia (Decca, 1998)
Mozart: Mitridate (Decca, 1999)
Haydn: Armida (Teldec 2000)
Handel: Rinaldo (Decca, 2000)
Mozart: Don Giovanni (Arthaus, 2001, DVD)
Bellini: La sonnambula (Decca, 2008)
Halevy: Clari (Decca, 2008, DVD)
Bellini: Norma (Decca, 2013)

Recitals with orchestra

Rossini Arias (1989)
Mozart Arias (1991)
Rossini Heroines (1992)
Mozart Portraits (1994)
Mozart Arias (1996)
The Vivaldi Album (1999)
Cecilia and Bryn (1999)
Gluck Italian Arias (2001)
The Salieri Album (2003)
Opera Proibita (2005)
 Viva Vivaldi! Arias & Concertos (Arthaus, 2005, DVD)
Maria (A Tribute to Maria Malibran) (2007)
Sacrificium (Arias written for castrati) (2009)
Mission (Arias and duets of Agostino Steffani) (2012)
St. Petersburg (2014)
Antonio Vivaldi (2018)
Farinelli (2019)

Recitals with piano
Rossini Recital (1990)
If You Love Me – "Se tu m'ami": Eighteenth-century Italian Songs (1992)
The Impatient Lover – Italian Songs by Beethoven, Schubert, Mozart, Haydn (1993)
Chant D'Amour (1996)
An Italian Songbook (1997)
Live in Italy (1998)

Recitals with cello
Dolce Duello: Cecilia & Sol – with Sol Gabetta (Decca Classics) released 11 November 2017

Sacred
Rossini: Stabat Mater (1990)
Mozart: Requiem (1992)
Scarlatti: Salve Regina, Pergolesi: Stabat Mater, Salve Regina (1993)
Rossini: Stabat Mater (1996)

Cantatas
Rossini Cantatas Volume 2

Compilations
A Portrait (1995)
The Art of Cecilia Bartoli (2002)
Sospiri (2010)

References

Sources
Blyth, Alan: "Cecilia Bartoli", Grove Music Online ed. L. Macy (Accessed 20 October 2008), (subscription access)
Chernin, Kim, and Renate Stendhal. Cecilia Bartoli: the Passion of Song. Women's, 1999.

External links

 
 Bartoli's Record Label
 
Swafford, Jan, "Nature's Rejects, The music of the castrati", Slate, 9 November 2009
 Cecilia Bartoli infos and photos at cosmopolis.ch
 Cecilia Bartoli & Mozart : a portrait and a playlist, All About Mozart

1966 births
Living people
Conservatorio Santa Cecilia alumni
Commanders of the Order of Cultural Merit (Monaco)
Chevaliers of the Ordre des Arts et des Lettres
Grammy Award winners
Honorary Members of the Royal Academy of Music
Italian expatriates in Monaco
Italian expatriates in Switzerland
Italian operatic mezzo-sopranos
Italian performers of early music
Women performers of early music
20th-century Italian women opera singers
21st-century Italian women opera singers
Handel Prize winners
Herbert von Karajan Music Prize winners
Decca Records artists
Knights of the Order of Merit of the Italian Republic